Pruntytown is an unincorporated community at the junction of the Northwestern Turnpike (U.S. Route 50) and U.S. Route 250 in Taylor County, West Virginia, United States. It is the site of the former West Virginia Industrial Home for Boys, now the Pruntytown Correctional Center.

History
The first settlement at Pruntytown (the earliest known white settlement in what is now Taylor County) was made circa 1798 with pioneers John Prunty, Sr (1745-1823) and his son David (1768-1841). It was initially known as Cross Roads, from the intersection there of the old Clarksburg Pike and the old Beverly and Fairmont Road. On January 1, 1801 Cross Roads was renamed Williamsport in honor of Abraham Williams, a local resident. The name was changed again on January 23, 1845 to honor the Pruntys. This town served as the county seat from the county's founding in 1844 until a county election in 1878 moved it approximately three miles away, to Grafton.

Notable person
John Barton Payne (1855–1935), Pruntytown-born lawyer and U.S. Secretary of the Interior (1920–21)

External links 
Pruntytown Elementary School
Pruntytown Correctional Center

References 

Unincorporated communities in Taylor County, West Virginia
Unincorporated communities in West Virginia
Northwestern Turnpike
Clarksburg micropolitan area
Former county seats in West Virginia